Laband is a surname. Notable people with the name include:

Fritz Laband (1925–1982), German footballer
Felix Laband (born in 1977), South African electronic music artist
John Laband (born 1947), South African historian 
Paul Laband (1838–1918), German jurist

See also
Labant
Zimmermann–Laband syndrome, also known as Laband Zimmermann syndrome, and Laband's Syndrome, is an extremely rare autosomal dominant congenital disorder